Adam Mularczyk (Born January 19, 1923 in Poland – June 12, 1996 in Philadelphia) was a Polish theatre director and radio and film actor. He emigrated to the USA in 1974. Mularczyk is interred at Our Lady of Czestochowa Cemetery in Doylestown, PA.

Films 
1972: Poszukiwany, poszukiwana
1971: Milion za Laurę 
1971: Nie lubię poniedziałku 
1966: Pieczone gołąbki
1965: Popioły
1961: Dwaj panowie N 
1961: Milczące ślady
1957: Król Maciuś I

1923 births
1996 deaths
Polish male actors
20th-century Polish male actors